Get Here is the fourth studio album by the American singer/songwriter Brenda Russell. Released in 1988, it is Russell's most successful album to date and includes her hit single "Piano in the Dark" as well as the minor hit title track, "Get Here," which became an international success for Oleta Adams three years later.

Album history
After the release of her third album, Two Eyes (1983), Russell moved to Stockholm, Sweden and began writing songs for her fourth album in 1984. Working with several producers and recorded at ten different studios in Stockholm and Los Angeles, the album was ultimately released in 1988 and saw Russell return to the A&M Records label that had released her first two solo albums in 1979 and 1981 (her 1983 album had been released via Warner Bros.). The album peaked at number 49 on the US Billboard 200 and number 20 on the Billboard R&B chart.

The first single from the album was the ballad "Piano in the Dark", released in February 1988. The single, which features vocals by Joe "Bean" Esposito, became (and remains) Russell's biggest hit, peaking at number 6 on the US Billboard 100 and was also a Top 30 hit in the UK (No. 23), as well as earning Grammy nominations for "Song of the Year" and "Best Pop Performance by a Duo or Group With Vocals" (Russell would also garner a nomination for "Best Pop Vocal Performance, Female" for Get Here). Other singles from the album include "Le Restaurant" (featuring David Sanborn on saxophone) and the dance track "Gravity". The title track of the album was also released as a single and was a minor R&B hit. It was later recorded by Oleta Adams and became a huge trans-Atlantic hit for her in 1991 (US No. 5, UK No. 4).

Track listing
Credits are adapted from the album’s Liner Notes
 "Gravity" (Brenda Russell, Gardner Cole) - 3:28
 "Just A Believer" (featuring Dave Koz) (Russell, Jeff Hull) - 3:55
 "Piano in the Dark" (featuring Joe Esposito)(Russell, Hull, Scott Cutler) - 5:19
 "This Time I Need You" (Russell, Joe Turano) - 4:54
 "Make My Day" (Russell) - 4:24
 "Le Restaurant" (featuring David Sanborn)(Russell) - 4:33
 "Midnight Eyes" (Russell) - 3:40
 "Get Here" (Russell) - 4:56

Personnel 
Credits adapted from AllMusic and the album’s liner notes.

Musicians 

 Brenda Russell – lead vocals (all tracks), backing vocals (4-7)
 Gardner Cole – synthesizers (1), drum machine (1)
 Wayne Linsey – additional synthesizers (1)
 Jeff Hull – synthesizers (2, 3, 7), drum machine (2, 3, 7)
 Michael Ruff – additional synthesizers (3)
 Russell Ferrante – acoustic piano (3, 6), synthesizers (6, 8)
 Peter Ljung – synthesizers (4, 8), additional synthesizers (5)
 Anders Neglin – synthesizers (4)
 Larry Williams – synthesizers (4, 5), horns (5)
 Kevin Toney – additional synthesizers (5)
 Joe Sample – Rhodes piano (8)
 Paul Jackson Jr. – guitars (1)
 James Harrah – guitars (3)
 Peter O. Ekberg – guitars (4)
 Henrik Janson – guitars (4, 5, 8), guitar solo (5)
 Don Griffin – additional guitars (5)
 Dann Huff – guitars (7)
 Janne Schaffer – guitar synthesizer (8)
 Nathan East – bass (5)
 Jimmy Haslip – bass (6)
 Ed Brown – bass (7)
 Sam Bengtsson – bass (8)
 Per Lindvall – drums (4, 5)
 Vinnie Colaiuta – drums (6)
 Åke Sundqvist – drums (8), percussion (8)
 Dave Koz – saxophone (2)
 David Sanborn – saxophone solo (6)
 Jerry Hey – trumpet (6), flugelhorn (6)
 The Jam Squad (Joe Esposito, Donny Gerrard, Howard Smith and Joe Turano) – backing vocals (1)
 Joe Esposito – male vocals (3)
 The Jamettes (Charlotte Crossley, Paulette Parker and Sharon Robinson) – backing vocals (2)
 Joe Turano – additional backing vocals (4)

Note: Paulette Parker is also known as Maxayn Lewis.

Production 
 Producers – Brenda Russell (All Tracks); Stanley Clarke (1 & 2); Jeff Hull (3); Andre Fischer (3-8); Peter O. Ekberg (4, 5 & 8).
 Executive producer – Brenda Russell
 Recording engineers – Csaba Petocz, Bill Schnee, Steve Sykes, Jan Ugand and Gary Wagner.
 Assistant engineers – Jim Dineen, Reggie Dozier, Mike Edwards, Steve Ford, Toni Greene, Debbie Johnson, Michael C. Ross, Micajah Ryan, Joe Schiff and Brad Stevens.
 Mixing – Csaba Petocz (1); Bill Schnee (2-8).
 Mastered by Doug Sax at The Mastering Lab (Los Angeles, CA).
 Art direction – Chuck Beeson
 Album design and special photo treatments – Donald Kreiger
 Photography – Raul Vega
 Production assistant and album coordination – Marsha Burns

Charts
Album

Singles

References

Brenda Russell albums
1988 albums
albums produced by Stanley Clarke
A&M Records albums